Robert Samuel Brown (16 October 1895 –  1980) was a professional footballer who played for Tottenham Hotspur and Aldershot.

Football career 
Brown began his career at his local club non-League Thorneycrofts before joining Tottenham Hotspur. The left back made 45 appearances in all competitions for the White Hart Lane club between 1919–23. Brown ended his football career at Aldershot.

References 

1895 births
1980 deaths
Footballers from Southampton
English footballers
English Football League players
Tottenham Hotspur F.C. players
Aldershot F.C. players
Association football fullbacks